Lethwei or Burmese boxing, is a full contact combat sport from Myanmar that uses stand-up striking including headbutts. Lethwei is considered to be one of the most brutal martial arts in the world, as the sport is practiced bareknuckle with only tape and gauze while fighters are allowed to strike with their fists, elbows, knees, and feet, and the use of headbutts is also permitted. Disallowed in most combat sports, headbutts are important weapons in a Lethwei fighter's arsenal, giving Lethwei its name of The Art of 9 Limbs, and deemed one of the bloodiest martial arts. A vast majority of Lethwei fighters originate from the Karen ethnicity.

History 

The traditional martial arts of Myanmar are regrouped under a term called "thaing", which includes bando, banshay, naban, shan gyi and Lethwei. According to researchers, thaing can be traced in its earliest form to the 12th century of the Pagan Kingdom dynasty.

In ancient times, matches were held for entertainment and were popular with every strata of society. Participation was opened to any male, whether noble or commoner. At that time, matches took place in sand pits instead of rings. Boxers fought without protective equipment, only wrapping their hands in hemp or gauze. There were no draws, the fight went on until one of the participants was knocked out or could no longer continue. Back then, Burmese boxing champions would enter the ring and call for open challenges.

Traditional matches include the Flagship Tournament, which are still fought throughout Myanmar, especially during holidays or celebration festivals like Thingyan.

Lethwei went through many years of suppression during the British colonial rule of Burma. The sport was revived under General Ne Win's nationalistic government Compared to Muay Thai, in Lethwei, punches are generally favoured over kicks because of their ability to draw blood easier.

In rural areas, having a skilled child fighter has been a way of escaping poverty. As of 2017, the minimum monthly wage in Myanmar was around $70 USD and children as young as ten years old could compete in Lethwei and can earn from $30 to $100.

The New Era 
In modern times, the sport is kept alive in Lower Burma in Mon State and Karen State where matches are held for events such as New Year's celebrations.

Kyar Ba Nyein, who participated in boxing at the 1952 Summer Olympics, pioneered modern Lethwei by setting in place modern rules and regulations. He travelled around Myanmar, especially the Mon and Karen states, where Lethwei is more actively practiced. After training with some of the fighters, Kyar Ba Nyein brought some to Mandalay and Yangon to compete in matches.

In 1996, the Myanmar Traditional Lethwei Federation (MTLF), a branch of the Myanmar's Ministry of Health and Sports, added the modern Lethwei rules for the occasion of the Golden Belt Championship in Yangon. The bouts, along with the undercard fights, were organized by the Ministry of Sport, Myanmar Traditional Lethwei Federation and KSM group. This marked a big addition to the art of Lethwei and potentially would make Burmese boxing more marketable internationally.

On July 18, 2015, ONE Championship held the first Lethwei fight its history inside a cage at the occasion of ONE Championship: Kingdom of Warriors in Yangon, Myanmar. The fight showcased Burmese fighters Phyan Thway and Soe Htet Oo in a dark match and the result was a draw according to the traditional Lethwei rules.

In 2017, ONE Championship and World Lethwei Championship officially entered into a partnership to share athletes to fight in each other's organization. On June 30, 2017, ONE Championship held a Lethwei match at ONE Championship: Light of a Nation between Thway Thit Win Hlaing and Soe Htet Oo. Thway Thit Win Hlaing would end up winning a decision according to WLC point system.

In 2016, Myanmar's first international Lethwei promotion called World Lethwei Championship (WLC) launched its events using the modern Lethwei rules.

In 2019, the WLC marked history by broadcasting WLC 7: Mighty Warriors, the first Lethwei event, internationally live on UFC Fight Pass.

Opening to the world 
From 7 to 12 July 2001, twelve years after Burma changed its name to Myanmar, the first international event took place in Yangon with professional fighters from the United States facing Burmese fighters under full traditional Lethwei rules. The delegation of three American fighters brought by the IKF were Shannon Ritch, Albert Ramirez and Doug Evans. Ritch faced Ei Htee Kaw, Ramirez faced Saw Thei Myo, and Evans faced openweight Lethwei champion Wan Chai. All three Americans lost to the Burmese. A revenge match with American and European fighters was cancelled the last minute by Lethwei promoters and the military in 2002.

From 10 to 11 July 2004, the second event headlining foreigners took place with four Japanese fighters fighting against Burmese fighters. They were mixed martial arts fighters Akitoshi Tamura, Yoshitaro Niimi, Takeharu Yamamoto and Naruji Wakasugi. Tamura knocked out Aya Bo Sein in the second round and became the first foreigner to beat a Myanmar Lethwei practitioner in an official match. International matches continued with the exciting Cyrus Washington vs. Tun Tun Min trilogy.

In 2016, after having previously fought to an explosive draw, Dave Leduc and Tun Tun Min rematched at the Air KBZ Aung Lan Championship in Yangon, Myanmar. The rematch was sweetened by an added bonus: ownership of the Lethwei Openweight World Championship Belt. Leduc became the first non-Burmese fighter to win the Lethwei Golden Belt and become Lethwei world champion after defeating Tun Tun Min in the second round.

Following his title defence, Leduc said in an interview, "I have so much vision for this sport. I see Lethwei doing the same for Myanmar as what Muay Thai has done for Thailand."

On April 18, 2017, for his second title defense under traditional rules, Dave Leduc faced Turkish Australian challenger Adem Yilmaz at Lethwei in Japan 3: Grit in Tokyo, Japan. This marked the first Lethwei World title fight headlining two non-Burmese in the sport's history and for the occasion, the Ambassador of Myanmar to Japan was present at the event held in the Korakuen Hall.

Sanctioning worldwide 
Due to the violent ruleset, Lethwei is difficult to sanction and is illegal in most countries outside of Myanmar. Even though headbutts are allowed in Lethwei, they are banned from most other combat sports including mixed martial arts, kickboxing, and Muay Thai. As of 2022, Myanmar Lethwei is only legal in the following countries: Myanmar, Japan, Singapore, Slovakia, Austria, Thailand, Taiwan, England, United States (only the state of Wyoming), New Zealand and Poland.

In popular culture 
Lethwei has been featured in media, including films, television, manga, anime. The combat sport gained worldwide attention after Dave Leduc defeated Tun Tun Min in 2016.

Film

Television 
Lethwei has been featured in television and documentaries.

Manga and animation 
Lethwei has been featured in the popular Japanese manga series Kengan Ashura. In the series, the Burmese Lethwei master named Saw Paing, is so indestructible that an opponent shatters every bone in their hand trying to punch him.

Traditional gesture

Lekkha moun 
The lekkha moun is the traditional gesture performed by Lethwei fighters to challenge their opponents with courage and respect. The lekkha moun is done by clapping 3 times with right palm to the triangle shaped hole formed while bending the left arm. The clapping hand must be in form of a cup, while the left hand must be placed under the right armpit. The lekkha moun is done at the beginning of the Lethwei yay and can also be done while fighting.

This invitation to fight is inspired from the birds of prey, like the eagle, as they flap their wings when flying and hunting.

Lethwei yay 
The Lethwei yay could be described as a fight dance. It is performed before the fight as a way to showcase the fighter's skills and as a victory dance after the fight. The lekkha moun is usually confused with the lethwei yay, but the lekkha moun is done along with the Lethwei yay.

Before modernisation, especially in colonial times, the pre-fight dance was more commonly referred to as han yay (ဟန်ရေး). Performed in accordance with the tempo of the traditional orchestra (ဆိုင်း), it incorporated a much more elaborate dance and show of skills. Boastful poetry was sometimes recited along with the dance.

Rules 

Permitted techniques

 Headbutts
 All punches
 All elbow strikes
 All knee strikes
 All kicks
 Extensive clinching
 Sweeps, throws and takedowns

The use of the feet, hands, knees, elbows and head is permitted.

Rounds

Each bout can be booked as a 3, 4 or 5 round fight with 3 minutes per round and a 2-minute break in between rounds. Championship bouts are 5 round fights with 3 minutes per round and a 2-minute break between rounds.

Fighting attire

The Burmese bareknuckle boxing rules prohibits the use of gloves.

 The fighters must only wear tape, gauze and electrical tape on their hands and feet.
 The fighters shall wear only shorts, without a shirt or shoes.
 The fighters must wear a groin protector.
 The fighters must wear a gum shield.

The fighters are required to apply the wrapping in front of the fight officials, who will endorse the wraps.

Referee

One referee oversees the fight. The referee has the power to:
 End the fight if he considers one fighter to be significantly outclassed by his opponent.
 Stop the fight and refer to the doctor if a fighter is heavily wounded.
 Warn the fighters. He makes sure the fight proceeds fairly and in compliance with the rules.

Traditional rules 
The traditional rules, also known as yoe yar rules, come from the Burmese Myanma yoe yar Latway, which means Myanmar traditional boxing. Traditional matches are still fought throughout Myanmar, especially during festivals or celebrations like Thingyan. Traditional Lethwei is notorious for not having a scoring system and for its controversial rule of knock-out only to win.

At the end of the match, in the eventuality that there is no knockout or stoppage, if the two fighters are still standing, even if one fighter dominated the fight, the match is declared a draw. Fighters can win by incapacitating their rivals in a few different ways.

 A knock-out (KO) is when a fighter falls to the ground, leans unconscious or if a fighter is unable to stand up or defend themself for 20 seconds (10 counts with 1 count every 2 seconds).
 When 3 counts are performed in a single round, the fight is terminated and scored as knock-out (count limit)(KO).
 When 4 counts are performed during the entire duration of the fight, the match is terminated and scored as knock-out (count limit)(KO).
 A technical knock-out (TKO) is when a fighter forfeits, has an injury or is in a position that can damage or severely harm them if the fight continues. The ring doctor is consulted and makes the decision.

Promotions that use traditional rules
 Most Lethwei promotions in Myanmar
 Annual Myanmar Lethwei World Championship
 Air KBZ Aung Lan Championship
 International Lethwei Federation Japan
 Challenge fights
 Flagship Tournaments
 Festivals & celebrations

Golden Belt 
For Lethwei fighters, the traditional Lethwei Golden Belt is regarded as the highest and most prestigious award.

There is only one Golden Belt champion for each weight categories, with the Openweight class champion being considered the strongest fighter in Myanmar. The Openweight Champion is the equivalent of being pound-for-pound champion in the world of lethwei.

Win Zin Oo, Lethwei coach and gym owner explains:

Injury time-out 
 If a knockout or injury occurs, the fighter can take a special 2 minute time-out to recover. After the time-out the fighter can choose whether he wishes to continue the bout or not. Each fighter may only do so once during the fight.
 The time-out cannot be used in the fifth round.
 The use of the time-out is considered as 1 count.

Modern rules 
In 1996, for the inaugural Golden Belt Championship, the two-minute injury timeout was removed and judges were added ringside. This modified ruleset helped prevented the outcome of a draw and helped choose a winner to advance in the tournament. Former fighter Win Tun was the most successful fighter in Golden Belt Championship history, having won four Golden Belts. In recent years, the World Lethwei Championship, Myanmar's first international promotion, is the biggest proponent of the modern rules in order to follow the international safety and regulation for combat sports.

Promotions that use tournament rules

 World Lethwei Championship
 Annual Golden Belt Championship

Judging

The knockout is still highly desired under this ruleset, but in the event that a bout goes the distance, judges will present a decision. The 3 judges score the bout based on aggression, number of significant strikes per round, damage and blood drawn. Fighters have a maximum of 3 knockdowns per round and 4 knockdowns in the entire fight before the fight is ruled a knockout.

Techniques 
Aside from punches, kicks, elbows and knee attacks, Burmese fighters also make use of head-butts, raking knuckle strikes and take downs.

Headbutt (Gowl Tite)

Punching (Let Thee)

Elbow (Tel Daung) 
The elbow can be used in several ways as a striking weapon: horizontal, diagonal-upwards, diagonal-downwards, uppercut, downward, backward-spinning and flying. They can be used as either a finishing move or as a way to cut the opponent's eyebrow to draw blood.

Elbows can be used to great effect as blocks or defenses against, for example, spring knees, side body knees, body kicks or punches. When well connected, an elbow strike can cause serious damage to the opponent, including cuts or even a knockout.

Kicking (Kan)

Knee (Doo)

Foot-thrust 
The foot-thrust is one of the techniques in Lethwei. It is used as a defensive technique to control distance or block attacks and as a way to set up attack. Foot-thrusts should be thrown quickly but with enough force to knock an opponent off balance.

Note - The Myanglish spelling and phonetics based spelling are two different things. The words used are phonetics based words which are more friendly and easy to pronounce for non-Myanmar speaking people. The phonetics wording is provided by Liger Paing from United Myanmar Bando Nation.

Weight classes

Famous practitioners 

 Kyar Ba Nyein
 Pyi Taw Pyan
 Bala Sein
 Phyu Gyi
 Kyaung Thar
 Moe Kyoe
 Tway Ma Shaung
 Dave Leduc
 Tun Tun Min
 Too Too
 Saw Nga Man
 Lone Chaw
 Shwe Sai
 Soe Lin Oo
 Cyrus Washington
 Wan Chai
 Mite Yine
 Tun Lwin Moe
 Nguyễn Trần Duy Nhất

See also 

 List of Lethwei fighters
 Burmese martial arts
 Bando
 Banshay
 Naban
 Pongyi thaing

References

Further reading 
 Maung Gyi, Burmese bando boxing, Ed. R.Maxwell, Baltimore, 1978
 Zoran Rebac, Traditional Burmese boxing, Ed. Paladin Press, Boulder, 2003

 
Burmese martial arts
Combat sports
Sport in Myanmar
Sports originating in Myanmar